Henry Allen Huber (November 6, 1869 – January 31, 1933) was a Wisconsin politician. He was born in Evergreen, Pennsylvania, in 1869 and moved to Pleasant Springs, Wisconsin, with his parents at the age of ten. He graduated from the University of Wisconsin in 1892 and set up a law practice in Stoughton. He was city attorney for Stoughton, Wisconsin, and served on the Dane County Board of Supervisors. He served as a Republican in the Wisconsin State Assembly from 1905 until 1906, and in the Wisconsin State Senate from 1913 until 1924.

During his time as a senator, he gained national recognition for writing the Huber Law, which allowed county prisoners to be employed during the day and launched the concept of the prison work release program; he is also known for introducing landmark unemployment legislation. He later served four terms as the 25th Lieutenant Governor of Wisconsin, from 1925 until 1933, under four different governors.

Death
Huber died of a heart ailment, at Madison General Hospital, Madison, Wisconsin, on January 31, 1933, aged 63.

References

Sources

1869 births
1933 deaths
People from Ross Township, Allegheny County, Pennsylvania
Lieutenant Governors of Wisconsin
Republican Party members of the Wisconsin State Assembly
Republican Party Wisconsin state senators
County supervisors in Wisconsin
People from Stoughton, Wisconsin
Politicians from Madison, Wisconsin
People from Pleasant Springs, Wisconsin
University of Wisconsin–Madison alumni
University of Wisconsin Law School alumni